Pseudouridylate synthase 7 homolog-like protein is an enzyme that in humans is encoded by the PUS7L gene.

Model organisms

Model organisms have been used in the study of PUS7L function. A conditional knockout mouse line, called Pus7ltm2a(KOMP)Wtsi was generated as part of the International Knockout Mouse Consortium program — a high-throughput mutagenesis project to generate and distribute animal models of disease to interested scientists.

Male and female animals underwent a standardized phenotypic screen to determine the effects of deletion. Twenty three tests were carried out on homozygous mutant mice and one significant abnormality was observed: an increased susceptibility to bacterial infection.

References

Further reading

Genes mutated in mice